Alice Coltrane ( McLeod; August 27, 1937January 12, 2007), also known by her adopted Sanskrit name Turiyasangitananda, was an American jazz musician, composer and swamini.

An accomplished pianist and one of the few harpists in the history of jazz, Coltrane recorded many albums as a bandleader, beginning in the late 1960s and early 1970s for Impulse! and other record labels. She was married to the jazz saxophonist and composer John Coltrane, with whom she performed in 1966–1967. One of the foremost proponents of spiritual jazz, her eclectic music proved influential both within and outside the world of jazz.

Coltrane's career slowed from the mid 1970s as she became more dedicated to her religious education. She founded the Vedantic Center in 1975 and the Shanti Anantam ashram in California in 1983, where she served as spiritual director.  On July 3, 1994, she rededicated and inaugurated the land as Sai Anantam Ashram. During the 1980s and 1990s, she recorded several albums of Hindu devotional songs before returning to jazz in the 2000s.

Biography

Early life and career (1937–1965)
Coltrane was born Alice McLeod on August 27, 1937, in Detroit, Michigan, and grew up in a musical household. Her mother, Anna McLeod, was a member of the choir at her church; her half-brother, Ernest Farrow, became a jazz bassist; and her younger sister, Marilyn McLeod, became a songwriter at Motown. With the encouragement of her father, Alice McLeod pursued music and started to perform in various clubs around Detroit, until moving to Paris in the late 1950s. She studied classical music, and also jazz with Bud Powell in Paris, where she worked as the intermission pianist at the Blue Note Jazz Club in 1960. It was there that McLeod appeared on French television in a performance with Lucky Thompson, Pierre Michelot and Kenny Clarke. She married Kenny "Pancho" Hagood in 1960 and had a daughter with him. The marriage ended soon after, on account of Hagood's developing heroin addiction, and McLeod was forced to return to Detroit with her daughter. She continued playing jazz as a professional in Detroit, with her own trio and as a duo with vibraphonist Terry Pollard. In 1962–63, she played with Terry Gibbs' quartet, during which time she met John Coltrane. In 1965, they married in Juárez, Mexico. John Coltrane became stepfather to Alice Coltrane's daughter Michelle, and the couple had three children together: John Jr. (1964, a bassist who died in a car accident in 1982); Ravi (b. 1965, a saxophonist); and Oranyan (b. 1967, a DJ). Oranyan later played saxophone with Santana for a period of time.

Solo work (1967–1978)
Alice and John's growing involvement in spirituality influenced some of John's compositions and projects, such as A Love Supreme. In January 1966, Alice Coltrane replaced McCoy Tyner as pianist with John Coltrane's group. She subsequently recorded with him and continued playing with the band until John's death on July 17, 1967. After her husband's death, she continued to forward the musical and spiritual vision, and started to release records as a composer and bandleader. Her first album, A Monastic Trio, was recorded in 1967. From 1968 to 1977, she released thirteen full-length records. As the years passed, her musical direction moved further from standard jazz into the more cosmic, spiritual world. Albums like Universal Consciousness (1971), and World Galaxy (1972), show a progression from a four-piece lineup to a more orchestral approach, with lush string arrangements and cascading harps. Until 1973, she released music with Impulse! Records, the jazz label for which her husband recorded. From 1973 to 1978, she released primarily on Warner Bros. Records until she stepped away from the public eye.

Ashram years (1975–1995)
After the death of her husband, Coltrane experienced a period of trial. She suffered from severe weight loss and sleepless nights, as well as hallucinations. This tapas (a Sanskrit term she used to describe her suffering), led her to seek Hindu spiritual guidance from the guru Swami Satchidananda and later from Sathya Sai Baba. By 1972, she abandoned her secular life, and moved to California, where she established the Vedantic Center in 1975. By the late 1970s, she had changed her name to Turiyasangitananda. She was the spiritual director, or swamini, of Shanti Anantam Ashram (later renamed Sai Anantam Ashram in Chumash Pradesh) which the Vedantic Center established in 1983 near Malibu, California. Alice would perform formal and informal devotional Vedic ceremonies at the ashram. She performed solo chants, known as bhajans, and group chants, or kirtans. She developed original melodies from the traditional chants and started to experiment by including synthesizers and sophisticated song structures. This culminated in her first spiritual cassette, Turiya Sings, in 1982. The cassette was released only to the members of the ashram, through her publishing company, the Avatar Book Institute. Through the mid 1980s into the mid 1990s, she released three more cassettes, Divine Songs in 1987, Infinite Chants in 1990, and Glorious Chants in 1995. New York-based label Luaka Bop released a compilation of tracks from her ashram tapes as World Spirituality Classics 1: The Ecstatic Music of Alice Coltrane Turiyasangitananda in May 2017.

The ashram was destroyed in the 2018 Woolsey Fire.

Later years and death (1995–2007)
The 1990s saw renewed interest in her work, which led to the release of the compilation Astral Meditations, and in 2004 she released her comeback album Translinear Light.  Following a 25-year break from major public performances, she returned to the stage for three U.S. appearances in the fall of 2006, including a concert at Ann Arbor's Hill Auditorium presented by University Musical Society of the University of Michigan on September 23, which would have been John Coltrane's 80th birthday, and culminating on November 4 with a concert for the San Francisco Jazz Festival with her son Ravi, drummer Roy Haynes, and bassist Charlie Haden.

Alice Coltrane died of respiratory failure at West Hills Hospital and Medical Center in suburban Los Angeles in 2007, aged 69. She is buried alongside John Coltrane in Pinelawn Memorial Park, Farmingdale, Suffolk County, New York.

Impact
Paul Weller dedicated his song "Song for Alice (Dedicated to the Beautiful Legacy of Mrs. Coltrane)", from his 2008 album 22 Dreams, to Coltrane; the track titled "Alice" on Sunn O)))'s 2009 album Monoliths & Dimensions was similarly inspired. Electronic musician Steve "Flying Lotus" Ellison is the grandnephew of Alice Coltrane. On his 2010 album Cosmogramma, he paid tribute to Coltrane in the form of a song titled "Drips//Auntie's Harp", in which he sampled her harp from the track "Blue Nile", featured on the album Ptah, the El Daoud (1970). The song "That Alice" on Laura Veirs' album Warp and Weft is about Coltrane. Orange Cake Mix included a song entitled "Alice Coltrane" on their 1997 LP Silver Lining Underwater. Poet giovanni singleton's book Ascension includes 49 poems written daily after Alice Coltrane's death.

Cauleen Smith's conceptual art exhibition Give It or Leave It featured two films, "Pilgrim" (2017) and "Sojourner" (2018), exploring Alice Coltrane's music and ashram.

Discography

As leader

Studio and live albums
 A Monastic Trio (Impulse!, 1968)
 Huntington Ashram Monastery (Impulse!, 1969)
 Ptah, the El Daoud (Impulse!, 1970)
 Journey in Satchidananda (Impulse!, 1971)
 Universal Consciousness (Impulse!, 1971)
 World Galaxy (Impulse!, 1972)
 Lord of Lords (Impulse!, 1973)
 Illuminations (Columbia, 1974) with Carlos Santana
 Eternity (Warner Bros, 1976)
 Radha-Krsna Nama Sankirtana (Warner Bros., 1977)
 Transcendence (Warner Bros., 1977)
 Transfiguration (Warner Bros., 1978)
 Turiya Sings (Avatar Book Institute, 1982; reissued by Impulse!/Verve/UMe/Universal, 2021)
 Divine Songs (Avatar, 1987)
 Infinite Chants (Avatar, 1990)
 Glorious Chants (Avatar, 1995)
 Translinear Light (Impulse!, 2004)
 Carnegie Hall '71 (Hi Hat, 2018) also released as Live at Carnegie Hall, 1971
 Live at the Berkeley Community Theater 1972 (BCT, 2019)
 Kirtan: Turiya Sings (Impulse!/Verve/UMe/Universal, 2021; different mixes of Turiya Sings discovered by Ravi Coltrane in 2004)

Compilations
 Reflection on Creation and Space (a Five Year View) (Impulse!, 1973)
 Priceless Jazz Collection (GRP, 1998)
 Astral Meditations (Impulse!, 1999)
 The Impulse Story (Impulse!, 2006)
 Universal Consciousness / Lord of Lords (Impulse!, 2011)
 Huntington Ashram Monastery/World Galaxy (Impulse!, 2011)
 World Spiritual Classics: Volume I: The Ecstatic Music of Alice Coltrane Turiyasangitananda (Luaka Bop, 2017)
 Spiritual Eternal: The Complete Warner Bros. Studio Recordings (Real Gone Music 2018)

As co-leader
 Cosmic Music (Impulse!, 1966–1968) with John Coltrane

As sidewoman
With John Coltrane
 Live at the Village Vanguard Again! (Impulse!, 1966)
 Live in Japan (Impulse!, 1966; released 1973)
 Offering: Live at Temple University (Resonance, 1966; released 2014)
 Stellar Regions (Impulse!, 1967; released 1995)
 Expression (Impulse!, 1967)
 The Olatunji Concert: The Last Live Recording (Impulse!, 1967; released 2001)
 Infinity (Impulse!, 1972)

With Terry Gibbs
 Terry Gibbs Plays Jewish Melodies in Jazztime (Mercury, 1963)
 Hootenanny My Way (Mercury, 1963)
 El Nutto (Limelight, 1964)
With Roland Kirk
 Left & Right (Atlantic, 1968)
With McCoy Tyner
 Extensions (Blue Note, 1970)
With Joe Henderson
 The Elements (Milestone, 1973)
With Charlie Haden
 Closeness (Horizon, 1976)
With Various Artists
 Stolen Moments: Red Hot + Cool (GRP, 1994)

See also
 List of jazz arrangers

References

External links

The Vedantic Center

African-American women composers
African-American jazz composers
American jazz composers
African-American jazz musicians
African-American jazz pianists
Jazz harpists
American jazz harpists
American jazz organists
Modal jazz pianists
Women jazz pianists
Kirtan performers
1937 births
2007 deaths
Jazz musicians from Michigan
Musicians from Detroit
Cass Technical High School alumni
Followers of Sathya Sai Baba
Deaths from respiratory failure
Impulse! Records artists
Warner Records artists
Women organists
20th-century jazz composers
20th-century African-American women singers
20th-century American composers
21st-century American keyboardists
Jazz musicians from Alabama
20th-century women composers
American Hindus
Converts to Hinduism from Christianity
African-American women musicians
Spiritual jazz musicians
20th-century women pianists